= Yacuy =

Coordinates: 22°23′S 63°48′W

Yacuy (Salta)
- Municipality and village
- Interactive map of Yacuy (Salta)
- Country: Argentina
- Province: Salta Province
- Time zone: UTC−3 (ART)

Yacuy (Salta) is a village and rural municipality in Salta Province in northwestern Argentina.
